Svenskt kvinnobiografiskt lexikon (SKBL), known in English as Biographical Dictionary of Swedish Women, is a Swedish biographical dictionary of Swedish women. It was started in 2018 when 1,000 articles about Swedish women were published in Swedish and English. There are plans to publish a further 1,000 articles in 2020 about women who have actively contributed to Swedish society. This activity has been financed by Bank of Sweden Tercentenary Foundation.

SKBL is produced by the University of Gothenburg and the articles are written by experts and researchers. The dictionary contains biographies of women who, across several centuries and in many different ways, have contributed to society’s development, both within Sweden and beyond. The entries, based on a mix of existing and brand-new research, were mainly selected with an emphasis on societal significance rather than personal fame. The selection includes female pioneers and women who fought for gender equality as well as those of historical significance. Finnish women are also included for the pre-1809 era.

From 2010 Lisbeth Larsson (1949–2021), a professor of literary studies, tried to create a more general dictionary with a focus on women to give a fairer picture of history (together with Inger Eriksson, operations manager at KvinnSam). The original plan was to publish a book but it was later decided to compile a database which could be accessed as a web-based dictionary.

Sources 

 About SKBL.se in English

Notes

External links 

 Biographical Dictionary of Swedish Women

Biographical dictionaries of women
Swedish biographical dictionaries
History of women in Sweden
Swedish online encyclopedias
Online person databases